Switzerland competed at the 1932 Winter Olympics in Lake Placid, United States.

Medalists

Bobsleigh

Nordic combined 

Events:
 18 km cross-country skiing
 normal hill ski jumping

The cross-country skiing part of this event was combined with the main medal event of cross-country skiing. Some athletes (but not all) entered in both the cross-country skiing and Nordic combined event, their time on the 18 km was used for both events.

The ski jumping (normal hill) event was held separate from the main medal event of ski jumping, results can be found in the table below.

Ski jumping

References

 Olympic Winter Games 1932, full results by sports-reference.com

Nations at the 1932 Winter Olympics
1932
Olympics, Winter